Blue River Township is the name of four townships in Indiana:

 Blue River Township, Hancock County, Indiana
 Blue River Township, Harrison County, Indiana
 Blue River Township, Henry County, Indiana
 Blue River Township, Johnson County, Indiana

See also 
 Blue River (disambiguation)

Indiana township disambiguation pages